The 2007 French Open mixed doubles tennis tournament was held in Paris, France from 27 May through to 10 June 2007. The defending champions were Katarina Srebotnik and Nenad Zimonjić, but they lost to Nathalie Dechy and Andy Ram in the finals.

Seeds 

1.Francesca Schiavone / Jonas Björkman did not take part, Anastasia Rodionova / Jordan Kerr took their place

Draw

Finals

Top half

Section 1

Section 2

Bottom half

Section 3

Section 4

See also 
List of tennis tournaments

References

External links 
 Draw
2007 French Open – Doubles draws and results at the International Tennis Federation

Mixed Doubles
French Open by year – Mixed doubles